CalTV is a student-run online television station at University of California, Berkeley. Since its founding, CalTV has grown into one of the largest student-run media organizations on the west coast. CalTV is a chartered organization of the Associated Students of the University of California (ASUC).

History 
In the spring of 2005, Associated Students of the University of California (ASUC) was able to allocate sufficient seed money to set up an online TV network.

Technology 
CalTV uses standards compliant and customized content management system coupled with the YouTube's online video player. CalTV produces video content using a Canon 60D DSLR and Adobe Creative Cloud software running on Apple iMac G5.

Content 
Seven different departments make up CalTV: four on-camera and three behind-the-scenes. They include:

On-Camera
 News
 Sports
 Entertainment
 Comedy

Behind-the-Scenes
 Post-Production
 Cinematography
 Business/Advertising/Marketing (BAM)

At first, the station produced a single show focusing exclusively on news events (local, national and international) but produced in a citizen journalism style. The show featured brief backgrounds on stories introduced by CalTV journalists followed by opinion from Berkeley students and professors.

With time, CalTV's content expanded into sports, arts and entertainment. "The CalTV Sports Highlight" began in 2006 and included coverage of California football, baseball, and water polo. The semester of Spring 2007, "The CalTV Show", an off-beat news show featuring commentary on student issues, began airing. "The CalTV Show" has been renamed "The CalBear Report."

"Back and Forth", included in the CalTV sports programming, resembles ESPN's Pardon the Interruption and features banter on sports related topics. "Sports Shorts" features updates on recent teams in action, as well as interviews with students on Sproul Plaza. "Bear in Mind" covers off-the-field stories on student athletes and teams.

CalTV debuted its Entertainment programming in 2010 when the former Music Department officially changed its name to Entertainment.

Special events 
CalTV has also been involved in the coverage of on-campus and off-campus special events. These events included exclusive interviews with such celebrities as:
 Jesse Eisenberg
 Andrew Garfield
 Channing Tatum
 Michael Moore
 Danny Boyle
 Morgan Spurlock
 Ryan Reynolds
 Chelsea Clinton
 John C. Reilly
 Jason Reitman
 Roland Emmerich
 Michel Gondry
 Will Ferrell
 Conan O'Brien
 Adam Sandler
 Woody Harrelson
 David Schwimmer
 Don Cheadle
 Jerry Seinfeld
 Regina King
 Emile Hirsch
 Viggo Mortensen
 The cast of Hot Rod
 The cast of Superbad
 The cast of Comedy Central's Reno 911!
 California First Lady Maria Shriver
 Former CBS anchor Dan Rather
 CNN Sr. Medical Correspondent Sanjay Gupta

Funding 
CalTV has been financially supported by ASUC. CalTV also works with Big Ideas @ Berkeley, an initiative that provides funding, support, and encouragement to interdisciplinary teams at UC Berkeley. The station has also been exploring revenue generation through ads and promotional activities.

Footage 
CalTV's footage has been featured on numerous media outlets including:
 KTVU
 Russia Today
 Colbert Report
 Rachel Maddow Blog

Alumni 
CalTV Alumni have gone on the work in the media industry for companies such as:
Creative Artists Agency
William Morris Endeavor
International Creative Management
Pixar
Disney Animation
Focus Features
The Daily Show
Colbert Report
Microsoft
ABC
NBC
CBS
MSNBC
CNN
NPR
Pac-12 Network
Los Angeles Times

Recognition 
CalTV has been recognized in local media. The Daily Cal, Berkeley's newspaper, has published articles on CalTV. The station has also gaining visibility in the Berkeley blogging community

References 

Internet television channels
University of California, Berkeley
2005 establishments in California